Willie Green Banks (March 17, 1946 – June 1989) was an American football offensive lineman in the National Football League for the Washington Redskins, New York Giants, and New England Patriots.  He played college football at Alcorn State University and was drafted in the sixth round of the 1968 NFL Draft.

See also
History of the New York Giants (1925-1978)

1946 births
1989 deaths
Alcorn State Braves football players
American football offensive guards
New England Patriots players
New York Giants players
Washington Redskins players